The Gang's All Here is the second studio album by the American Celtic punk band the Dropkick Murphys. It is their first album with Al Barr (ex-vocalist for The Bruisers), who replaced founding singer Mike McColgan in 1998. "10 Years of Service" was the album's only single; the music video received some minor airplay on MTV's 120 Minutes, a first for the band.

The album peaked at No. 184 on the Billboard 200.

Production
The album was produced by Lars Frederiksen.

Critical reception
CMJ New Music Report wrote that "Barr's gravelly voice complements '77-style punk riffs that fly by faster than a speeding bullet." Rolling Stone thought that "the four band members pummel through their anthems like punked-out Rock 'Em Sock 'Em robots."

AllMusic wrote that while the album "[took] up the expected us-against-the-world pose," its songwriting was of a higher standard than contemporary punk albums.

Track listing
All songs by Ken Casey and Matt Kelly unless otherwise noted
 "Roll Call" – 0:32
 "Blood and Whiskey" – 1:47
 "Pipebomb on Lansdowne" – 1:50
 "Perfect Stranger" – 1:58
 "10 Years of Service" – 2:45
 "Upstarts and Broken Hearts" – 2:56
 "Devil's Brigade" – 1:27
 "Curse of a Fallen Soul" – 3:00
 "Homeward Bound" – 2:00
 "Going Strong" – 3:06
 "The Fighting 69th" (Traditional) – 3:13
 "Boston Asphalt" – 1:39
 "Wheel of Misfortune" – 3:50
 "The Only Road" – 2:11
 "Amazing Grace" (Instrumental) (John Newton) – 2:38
 "The Gang's All Here" – 7:59
Contains a hidden track of guitarist Rick Barton's answering machine

Personnel
 Al Barr – vocals
 Rick Barton – guitar
 Ken Casey – bass guitar/vocals
 Matt Kelly – drums
 Joe Delaney – bagpipes on "Amazing Grace"
 Johnny Cunningham – fiddle on "Wheel of Misfortune" and "The Gang's All Here"
 Tularch Ard Pipe and Drum Corps – drums on "Roll Call"
 Jim Seigal - engineer
 Thomas "T.J." Johnson – engineer on "Roll Call"
 Marco Almera - cover

References

Dropkick Murphys albums
1999 albums
Hellcat Records albums